The 2014–15 James Madison Dukes women's basketball team represents James Madison University during the 2014–15 NCAA Division I women's basketball season. The Dukes, led by thirteenth year head coach Kenny Brooks, play their home games at the James Madison University Convocation Center and are members of the Colonial Athletic Association (CAA). They finished the season 29–4, 17–1 in CAA play to win the CAA regular season title. They also won the CAA Tournament Championship and earned an automatic bid to the NCAA women's basketball tournament. They lost in the first round to Ohio State.

Roster

Schedule

|-
!colspan=9 style="background:#450084; color:#C2A14D;"| Exhibition

|-
!colspan=9 style="background:#450084; color:#C2A14D;"| Regular season

|-
!colspan=9 style="background:#450084; color:#C2A14D;"| 2015 CAA Tournament

|-
!colspan=9 style="background:#450084; color:#C2A14D;"| NCAA Women's Tournament

Rankings

See also
 2014–15 James Madison Dukes men's basketball team

References

James Madison Dukes women's basketball seasons
James Madison
J